Citronella oil is an essential oil obtained from the leaves and stems of different species of Cymbopogon (lemongrass). The oil is used extensively as a source of perfumery chemicals such as citronellal, citronellol, and geraniol. These chemicals find extensive use in soap, candles and incense, perfumery, cosmetic, and flavouring industries throughout the world.
Citronella oil is also a plant-based insect repellent and has been registered for this use in the United States since 1948. The United States Environmental Protection Agency considers oil of citronella as a biopesticide with a non-toxic mode of action. 

Citronella oil has strong antifungal properties.

Types
Citronella oil is classified in trade into two chemotypes:

Ceylon type 
 CAS: 89998-15-2
 CAS: 8000-29-1
 EINECS: 289-753-6
 FEMA: 2308
 CoE: 39
 Obtained from: Cymbopogon nardus Rendle
 Main components: citronellal (5–15%), geraniol (18–20%) and geranyl acetate (2%), citronellol (6–8%), limonene (9–11%), and methyl isoeugenol (7–11%).

Java type 
 CAS: 91771-61-8
 CAS: 8000-29-1
 EINECS: 294-954-7
 FEMA: 2308
 CoE: 2046
 Obtained from: Cymbopogon winterianus Jowitt
 Main components: citronellal (32–45%), geraniol (21–24%) and geranyl acetate (3–8%), citronellol (11–15%), limonene (1–4%).

The higher proportions of citronellal and geraniol in the Java type oil make it a better source for perfumery derivatives. The standard quality of Java type from Indonesia is regulated by Indonesian authority under SNI 06-3953-1995, which requires citronellal minimum 35% and total geraniol minimum 85%.

Both types probably originated from Mana Grass of Sri Lanka, which according to Finnemore (1962) occurs today in two wild forms – Cymbopogon nardus var. linnae (typicus) and C. nardus var. confertiflorus. Neither wild form is known to be used for distillation to any appreciable extent.

Citronella oil from Cymbopogon species should not be confused with other similar lemony oils from Corymbia citriodora and Pelargonium citrosum.

Health questions
Direct application of citronella oil has been found to raise the heart rate of some people. Health Canada banned the oil's use as an insect repellent in 2012 but later lifted the ban in February 2015.

World production
At present, the world annual production of citronella oil is approximately 4,000 tonnes. The main producers are China and Indonesia - producing 40 percent of the world's supply. The oil is also produced in Taiwan, Guatemala, Honduras, Brazil, Sri Lanka, India, Argentina, Ecuador, Jamaica, Madagascar, Mexico, and South Africa.

The market for natural citronella oil has been eroded by chemicals synthesised from turpentine derived from conifers. However, natural citronella oil and its derivatives are preferred by the perfume industry.

Use as a repellent

Citronella oil is popular as a natural insect repellent. Its mosquito repellent qualities have been verified by research,  including effectiveness in repelling Aedes aegypti  (dengue fever mosquito). To be continually effective, most citronella repellent formulas need to be reapplied to the skin every 30–60 minutes.

Citronella candles (which burn citronella oil) are no more effective than other candles at repelling insects, and experts do not recommend it as a useful method. 

Research also indicates that citronella oil is an effective repellent for body lice, head lice, and stable flies. A study conducted by DARPA in 1963 determined that hydroxycitronellal was an effective repellent against both aquatic and terrestrial leeches.

The US Environmental Protection Agency states that citronella oil has little or no toxicity when used as a topical insect repellent, with no reports of adverse effects of concern over a 60-year period. Some products are applied to human skin, so EPA requires proper precautionary labeling to help assure safe use. If used according to label instructions in the US, citronella is not expected to pose health risks to people, including children and other sensitive populations. The US Food & Drug Administration considers citronella oil as generally recognized as safe (GRAS).

Canadian regulatory concerns with citronella as an insect repellent are primarily based on data-gaps in toxicology, not on incidents.

In the EU, Ceylon type citronella oil is placed on the category 3 list, with some safety concern regarding methyl eugenol. In the UK, EU legislation governing insect repellents came into force in September 2006, which banned citronella as an active ingredient in any insect repellent products. This applied to insect repellent for both humans and other animals. It can still be sold as a perfume, but must not be sold as an insect repellent.

References 

Biopesticides
Essential oils
Flavors